Jackie Robinson Stadium is a college baseball park in Los Angeles, California. It is the home field of the UCLA Bruins of the Pac-12 Conference.  Opened  in 1981, it is the smallest ballpark in the conference, with a seating capacity of 1,820.  It is named after former Bruin athlete Jackie Robinson, the first African-American major league baseball player of the modern era.

Robinson (1919–1972) attended UCLA from 1939 to 1941, after graduating from Pasadena Junior College. He was the first UCLA athlete to earn varsity letters in four sports: baseball, basketball, football, and track.  He played in the major leagues for ten seasons (1947–56), all with the Brooklyn Dodgers. A statue and a mural of Robinson can be found at the entrance concourse of the stadium.

Robinson's classmate, Hoyt Pardee (UCLA '41), gave a gift to help with its construction.

The stadium's "Steele Field" was dedicated in honor of the Steele Foundation on May 3, 2008, prior to a game against Arizona State, for its support of the stadium. The hitting facility at the stadium is named Jack and Rhodine Gifford Hitting Facility. Gifford played baseball at UCLA and graduated from its engineering school with a BSEE degree. He was a founder of Advanced Micro Devices and Maxim Integrated Products.

In 2010, a capacity crowd of 2,613 saw the Bruins defeat the defending national champion LSU Tigers 6–3 at the Los Angeles Regional of the NCAA Tournament on June 5. That season, the Bruins ranked 48th among Division I baseball programs in attendance, averaging 1,178 per home game. The ballpark's record attendance of 2,914 was set in 1997, against rival USC on March 23.

The stadium is not to be confused with the Jackie Robinson Memorial Field (dedicated on January 30, 1988) at Brookside Park in Pasadena, next to the Rose Bowl, where UCLA plays its home football games.

Court case
On August 30, 2013, a federal judge ruled that the United States Department of Veterans Affairs misused the West Los Angeles VA Medical Center campus where the stadium is located for a variety of uses, including the stadium, but stopped short of ordering the tenants off the property.  However, the judge's ruling left open the possibility that, if not modified or reversed, UCLA could lose the right to use the stadium.

Notable events

 January 26, 2013 – The presentation of the new  LED video board which was donated by the Gifford Foundation, one of the largest video displays in the Pac-12 Conference.
 April 14, 2013 –  Jackie Robinson Day was held to unveil a new mural of Robinson by Mike Sullivan and to celebrate the release of the movie 42, the True Story of an American Legend on April 12. Former player Tim Leary represented the Los Angeles Dodgers at the ceremony.
 June 1, 2020 – Los Angeles Police Department (LAPD) used the stadium parking lot to detain and process arrests of UCLA students and alumni engaged in protest against police brutality. UCLA administration confirmed prior knowledge of a request by the LAPD to use the stadium parking lot as a staging area.

Regionals and Super Regionals, NCAA Division I Baseball Tournament

2010 NCAA Tournament
Regional, June 4–7: No. 6 (1) UCLA, (2) LSU, (3) UC Irvine, (4) Kent State. Winner: UCLA.
Super Regional, June 11–13: No. 6 UCLA vs. Cal State Fullerton. Winner: UCLA.
 2011 NCAA Tournament
 Regional, June 3–5: (1) UCLA, (2) Fresno State, (3) UC Irvine, (4) San Francisco. Winner: UC Irvine.
 2012 NCAA Tournament
 Regional, June 1–3:  No. 2 (1) UCLA, (2) San Diego, (3) New Mexico, (4) Creighton. Winner: UCLA.
 Super Regional, June 8–10: No. 2 UCLA vs. TCU. Winner: UCLA.

 2013 NCAA Tournament
 Regional, May 31–June 2: (1) UCLA, (2) Cal Poly, (3) San Diego, (4) San Diego State. Winner: UCLA. 
 2015 NCAA Tournament
 Regional, May 29–June 1: (1) UCLA, (2) Ole Miss, (3) Maryland, (4) Cal State Bakersfield. Winner: Maryland.
 2019 NCAA Tournament
Regional, June 1–3: No. 1 (1) UCLA, (2) Baylor, (3) Loyola Marymount, (4) Omaha. Winner: UCLA.
Super Regional, June 7–9: No. 1 UCLA vs. Michigan. Winner: Michigan.

Motion picture set
Jackie Robinson Stadium was the location used for the climactic scene in the 1999 film Never Been Kissed in which Josie Geller (Drew Barrymore) waits for her first real kiss from Sam Coulson (Michael Vartan).

Notes
 August 29, 2013 – U.S. District Judge S. James Otero ruled that the West Los Angeles Veterans' Administration land leased for a baseball stadium, film studio storage lot and other businesses is illegal.
 October 21, 2013 – UCLA was given permission to appeal the court decision on the use of the stadium

See also
 List of NCAA Division I baseball venues
 UCLA Bruins
 UCLA Bruins baseball

References

External links

UCLA Bruins home page – Facilities

College baseball venues in the United States
UCLA Bruins baseball
Baseball venues in Los Angeles
Jackie Robinson
University of California, Los Angeles buildings and structures
1981 establishments in California
Sports venues completed in 1981
Baseball venues in California